Pseudocalotes microlepis, also known as Burmese false bloodsucker or small-scaled forest agamid, is a species of agamid lizard in the genus Pseudocalotes found in southern China (Hainan, Guizhou), Thailand, Laos, Myanmar and Vietnam.

References

Pseudocalotes
Reptiles of Myanmar
Reptiles of China
Reptiles of Laos
Reptiles of Thailand
Reptiles of Vietnam
Reptiles described in 1888
Taxa named by George Albert Boulenger